Rani Raj Kaur was the wife of Maha Singh, the leader of the Sukerchakia Misl and the mother of Maharaja Ranjit Singh, the founder of the Sikh Empire. She was affectionately known as Mai Malwain (Malwa Mother) after her marriage. She is also referred to as Sardarni Raj Kaur and was daughter of Raja Gajpat Singh Sidhu of Jind.

Family and marriage

Raj Kaur was the daughter of Raja Gajpat Singh Sidhu, a scion of the Phulkian Misl of Jind. She was married in 1774 (at the age of fifteen) to the 17-year-old Maha Singh, the heir of Charat Singh, the founder and leader of the Sukerchakia Misl. The marriage was beneficial for Maha Singh as it strengthened his position amongst the Sikhs.

Six years after their marriage, Raj Kaur gave birth to Maha Singh's only son on 2 November 1780. He was named Buddh Singh at birth, but was later renamed Ranjit Singh. The birth of a son was celebrated with alms-giving, feeding of the poor, and giving rich offerings to temples and shrines. Maha Singh did not have time to devote to his son's upbringing, nor did the conventions of the time give opportunity to Raj Kaur, confined as she was to the seclusion of the zenana (a practice which the Sikh ruling classes had taken from the Muslims) to see much of her son after he was old enough to be on his own.

Regent to Ranjit Singh
During the siege of Sodhra, which was being occupied by the Bhangi Misl, Maha Singh contracted dysentery and died in April 1790. Ranjit Singh was 9-years-old at the time of his father's death in 1790. Raj Kaur became Ranjit's regent during his minority and managed the affairs of the Sukerchakia Misl. She was assisted by Dewan Lakhpat Rai (the Dewan of her late husband) who is reputed to have acted with ability and enthusiasm. The teenage Ranjit Singh took hardly any interest in the affairs of the state, making Raj Kaur anxious for his future. She felt that marriage might bring him around to the responsibilities of life.

Ranjit had been betrothed (in Maha Singh's lifetime) to Mehtab Kaur, the only daughter of Sada Kaur and granddaughter of Jai Singh Kanhaiya, the chief of the powerful Kanhaiya Misl. Raj Kaur approached Sada Kaur to fix the nuptial date. Ranjit was fifteen years old when he left Gujranwala for Batala, the chief town of the Kanhaiyas, for his muklawa to Mehtab Kaur in 1796, the marriage took place in 1789. This alliance between the two important Sikh families was a major event for Punjab. All the leading Sikh chiefs were present at the wedding.

Raj Kaur also over saw Ranjit's nuptials with Raj Kaur Nakai, daughter of Sardar Ran Singh Nakai in 1792. They were betrothed when she was just an infant and he was merely 4 years old. The alliance was fixed by Maha Singh and Ran Singh Nakai's widow, Sardarni Karmo Kaur. His second marriage brought him a strategic military alliance just like his first wedding. Raj Kaur Nakai was renamed Datar Kaur, was affectionately spoken of as Mai Nakain and remained his most loved and respected queen. This wife of Ranjit Singh was also the favorite of Mai Malwain and in 1801 she bore Kharak Singh, the first grandchild of Mai Malwain.

In popular culture
Raj Kaur was a portrayed by Tasreen in the TV series titled Maharaja Ranjit Singh which aired on DD National. The series was produced by Raj Babbar.
Raj Kaur was portrayed by Sneha Wagh in Life OK's historical drama Sher-e-Punjab: Maharaja Ranjit Singh.

See also
Maha Singh
Ranjit Singh

References

Women of the Sikh Empire
1758 births
19th-century Indian women
19th-century Indian people
18th-century Indian women
18th-century Indian people
Year of death unknown